Caroline Franz is an American television writer.

Career
After graduating with a master's degree from the Columbia University Graduate School of Journalism in 1976, Ms. Franz began her daytime career as a writer for 'All My Children' (1977 - 1983).  In 1983, she was named headwriter of "As The World Turns."  In 1984, she became headwriter of 'Search for Tomorrow", but then returned as a scriptwriter to "As The World Turns" in 1985, where she remained until 1995.  In 1997,  Ms. Franz returned to "All My Children" as a scriptwriter, where she remained until 2000 after winning an Emmy award (following 13 nominations) for Outstanding Writing of a Daytime Serial.  She worked with two legendary writers, Agnes Nixon and Douglas Marland.

Awards and nominations
She has received 13 Daytime Emmy and 4 WGA Award nominations. 
She has won 1 Emmy and 2 WGA Awards.
.

External links
CNN-2000 WGA Award Winners, 1999 WGA AWARD WINNERS

American soap opera writers
American women writers
Year of birth missing (living people)
Living people
Women soap opera writers
21st-century American women